The Tristarc Stakes is a Melbourne Racing Club Group 2 Thoroughbred horse race for mares aged four-years-old and older, at Set Weights with penalties, over a distance of 1400 metres at Caulfield Racecourse, Melbourne, Australia in October. Total prize money for the race is A$300,000.

History
The race is named after the champion mare Tristarc, who won five Group 1 events including the 1985 Caulfield Stakes–Caulfield Cup double. The race initially was held on the first day of the MRC Spring Carnival but was later moved to the third day (Caulfield Cup day).  Prize money is A$300,000.

Name
 1987 - Tristarc Quality
 1988–2008 - Tristarc Stakes
 2009–2010 - Harrolds Stakes
 2011 onwards  - Tristarc Stakes

Grade
 1987–1993 - Listed Race
 1994–2004 - Group 3 race
 2005 onwards - Group 2 race

Distance
 1987 – 1200 metres
 1988 onwards - 1400 metres

Winners

 2022 - Chain Of Lightning
 2021 - Colette
 2020 - Madam Rouge
 2019 - Savatiano
 2018 - Shumookh
 2017 - Global Glamour
 2016 - First Seal
 2015 - La Passe
 2014 - Sweet Idea
 2013 - Red Tracer
 2012 - Streama
 2011 - More Joyous
 2010 - Culminate
 2009 - Typhoon Tracy
 2008 - Mimi Lebrock
 2007 - Miss Fantabulous
 2006 - Nuclear Free
 2005 - Infinite Grace
 2004 - Our Egyptian Raine
 2003 - Infinite Grace
 2002 - Reactive
 2001 - Pernod
 2000 - Lady Marion
 1999 - Bonanova
 1998 - Camino Rose
 1997 - Will Fly
 1996 - Chlorophyll
 1995 - Bionic Bess
 1994 - Procrastinate
 1993 - Mingling Glances
 1992 - Danjiki
 1991 - Reno Belle
 1990 - Ice Cream Sundae
 1989 - Whistling
 1988 - Taffeta Bow
 1987 - Canny Lass

See also
 List of Australian Group races
 Group races

References

Horse races in Australia
Sprint category horse races for fillies and mares
Caulfield Racecourse